Buppah Rahtree Phase 2: Rahtree Returns is a 2005 Thai comedy-horror film written and directed by Yuthlert Sippapak. It is a sequel to the 2003 film, Buppah Rahtree.

Plot

The vengeful female ghost, Buppah, continues to inhabit apartment 609. She shares the room with her ghost boyfriend, Ake, who has been left legless by Buppah after his transgressions in the first film. A blind woman named Thip rents a neighboring apartment. She is due for an eye operation, but the doctor treating her tries to rape her. He is stopped by Rahtree who takes pity upon Thip. Meanwhile, a comic foursome of bank robbers have entered Rahtree's apartment and are using it as a hideout after robbing a bank but find themselves in trouble with Ake and Buppah.

Its sequels are Rahtree Reborn and Rahtree Revenge. Buppah reborn to a girl and was raped and killed. Buppah's tutorial student Rang rents a neighboring apartment. He falls in love with the ghost. Meanwhile, a man J'Sam turns the third floor into an illegal casino. They are injured or killed by the ghost. The ghost is exorcised and reborn to another girl.

Cast
 Laila Boonyasak as Buppah Rahtree
 Krit Sripoomseth as Ake
 Pitchanart Sakakorn as Thip
 Phan Rojanarangsri as Doo
 Supakorn Srisawat as Dee
 Somjai Sukjai as Der
 Banphot Weerarat as Den
 Somlek Sakdikul as Master Tong

Festivals and awards
 The film was screened in competition at the 2005 Puchon International Fantastic Film Festival with the best actor prize being shared among the four comedian actors: Phan Rojanarangsri, Supakorn Srisawat, Somjai Sukjai and Banphot Weerarat.

References

External links
 

2005 films
Thai ghost films
Sahamongkol Film International films
Thai comedy horror films
Thai-language films
2005 comedy horror films
2005 comedy films